Philippe Tromeur is a French game designer.

Career
Philippe Tromeur is the creator of Wuthering Heights, a parodic role-playing game. The game was distributed free on the internet by French author Philippe Tromeur.

Tromeur also worked on the French versions of Nobilis and In Nomine Satanis / Magna Veritas.

References

External links
Site Web de Philippe Tromeur

Living people
Role-playing game designers
Year of birth missing (living people)